Santa Cruz Verapaz is a town and municipality in the Guatemalan department of Alta Verapaz. The municipality is situated at 1406 metres above sea level. It has a population of 32,042 (2018 census) and covers an area of 99.9 km². The annual festival is May 1-May 5.

History

Friars Juan de Torres, Pedro de Angulo and  Luis de Cancer, O.P. founded the settlement of "Santa Cruz de Santa Elena", in the region of the Munchú territory, and therefore, the town was originally known as "Santa Cruz Munchú". The town was established on 3 May 1543, according to the minutes from 1 May 1546 taken in Ciudad Real de San Juan Chamelco by Juan Matalbatz, governor of the region at the time.

The Catholic church was built in the 16th century and therefore it has a high historical value; like the one in Rabinal in Baja Verapaz Department, it was one of the first Catholic temples built in the region during the Capitulaciones de Tezulutlán.  The prestiberium design was magnificent, but it has been damaged over the centuries by the constant seismic events that affect the Guatemalan territory.

By an executive order of the Secretary of Education, the church was named as National Historic place on 12 July 1970.

Administrative division
Santa Cruz Verapaz has an urban and a rural area.

Territory configuration

Climate

Santa Cruz Verapaz has temperate climate (Köppen: Cfb).

Geographic location

See also

 Alta Verapaz Department

References

External links
Muni in Spanish

Municipalities of the Alta Verapaz Department